Jeffrey M. Conrad (born 1979) is an American politician who served on the Buffalo Common Council from the South District from April 2005 until January 2006.  Conrad ran unsuccessfully for an at-large seat on the Buffalo Public Schools Board of Education in 2019.

Common Council
Councilman and former Mayor Jimmy Griffin announced he was officially retiring from politics, and resigning from his position on the Buffalo Common Council. When he retired, it created a vacancy that needed to be filled.  The Buffalo Common Council unanimously appointed Conrad, the youngest South District member in the seat's history, to fill the vacancy. Conrad served as the Claims chairman, and on the Finance and MWBE committees.

Conrad's work on the Council included reversing the City of Buffalo's plan to reduce the number of police officers, support for the creation of the Erie Canal Harbor Development Corporation, providing neighborhood protections against the placement of sex offenders throughout the City of Buffalo, an improved 50-year relicensing agreement with the New York State Power Authority, and support for additional funding for the Buffalo Public Schools.

Conrad ran for a full term in November 2005, but was defeated by Mickey Kearns, the future New York State Assembly member and Erie County Clerk. He ran on the Independence Party, Conservative, and Working Families lines after losing the Democratic primary to Kearns.

Post political career
Conrad currently is employed at Catholic Charities as the Director of Workforce & Education, his portfolio includes programming in Erie and Niagara Falls, which includes the Tomorrow's Youth Today Program, Northland Workforce Training Center, NYS Empire State Poverty Reduction Initiative in Niagara Falls, Erie County Jump Start, Erie County United Works, East Delevan Academy, and Erie County Summer Youth Program. He also served as the Communications Director to Assemblyman Erik Bohen.

Conrad has been recognized by Bishop Timon-St. Jude, Mount Mercy Academy, and Goin’ South for his work in the community, including 15 years as race director, cross country and track coach at Mount Mercy.  In 2011 he was selected to the 20th Anniversary Buffalo Business First 40 Under 40 class and in 2014 by Buffalo Business First as a C-Level 612’ Rising Leader. He was recently elected to the John Timon Society at Bishop Timon-St. Jude High School.

Buffalo School Board
Conrad announced he was a candidate for the Buffalo Public Schools Board of Education in January 2019. He was unsuccessful, garnering 10% of the vote against 8 other candidates.

References

Living people
1979 births
Buffalo Common Council members
New York (state) Democrats
New York (state) Independents
St. Bonaventure University alumni